Raitu Kutumbam is a 1972 Indian Telugu-language drama film directed by T. Rama Rao. It stars Akkineni Nageswara Rao and Kanchana, with music composed by T. Chalapathi Rao.

Plot
The film begins in a village where lives a joint family, its elder son Joogaiah is a vagabond, and his wife Annapurna a benevolent rearing the 2 infant brothers-in-law Ramu & Madhu as equal to her daughter Lakshmi. She strives hard for survival by cultivating the leftover land. Spotting it elder one Ramu aids his sister-in-law by quitting his education. Years roll by, and Ramu toils and molds brother Madhu, as a Police officer. Besides, Joogaiah is still habituated to his vices, whose lavish expenses devour the strivings of Ramu. In the same village, Paanakaalu is a cruel moneylender whose only daughter Radha falls for Ramu. Meanwhile, Madhu marries a modern girl Geeta, the daughter of millionaire Venu Gopal Rao, who can't abide by the penniless and shifts to the city.

Parallelly, Lakshmi loves their distant relative Lokeswara Rao/Lokam and Ramu wants to knit them. But Lokam's mother Bhoolokamma a shrew, demands Rs. 10.000 as dowry. Though it is not affordable, Ramu's words are for the happiness of the couple. Now, Ramu seeks help for Madhu, who requests Geeta when she insults him, Ramu consoles Madhu and returns. In that critical situation, Ramu raises the fund by selling the property to Paanakaalu. During the time of the marriage, Joogaiah steals the amount. Knowing it, unscrupulous Bhoolokamma calls off the marriage despite tying the knot. Madhu is also absent from the venue as meets with an accident.

Eventually, Paanakaalu learns about the love affair of Ramu & Radha, so he intrigues him by auctioning their property. Now Ramu moves to the city along with his family, where Lokam supports him in getting a taxi and he toils to collect the dowry amount. After recovery, Madhu visits the village where he is aware of the misfortune and goes in search of his family. Meanwhile, Lokam plays a drama with the help of Ramu and rectifies his mother. At present, Madhu finds the whereabouts of his family and decides to take care of them, to which Geeta refuses. Humiliated, Madhu quits and stays along with Ramu. After some time, at a party, a guy Sudhakar tries to molest Geeta when Ramu saves her, which makes her realize the mistake and plead for a pardon from Madhu.

Simultaneously, Paanakaalu fixes a match for Radha, so, she escapes and reaches Ramu. Paanakaalu follows her and tries to take her against her will, when Ramu shields her, claiming her as his fiancé. On his way back, Paanakaalu spots Joogaiah, who has been troubled by debtors. Here Paanakaalu plots to relieve and bribe him to kill Ramu without knowing the reality. That night, Joogaiah seeks to slay Ramu, in between the combat, they recognize each other when Joogaiah repents and reforms himself. Frustrated Paanakaalu kidnaps Ramu's family. At last, Ramu rescues them and sees the end of Paanakaalu. Finally, the movie ends on a happy note with the marriage of Ramu & Radha.

Cast
Akkineni Nageswara Rao as Ramu
Kanchana as Radha
Ramakrishna as Madhu
Krishnam Raju as Sudhakar (Guest)
V. Nagayya as Ramu's father 
Satyanarayana as Joogaiah
Dhulipala as Panakaalu
Padmanabham as Lokeswara Rao / Lokam 
Sakshi Ranga Rao as Sambhaiah
G.V.Subba Rao as Venu Gopal Rao
Anjali Devi as Annapurna
Suryakantham as Bhulokamma
Geetanjali as Geetha 
Vijaya Lalitha as Dancer
Anitha as Lakshmi
Master Aadinarayana Rao as Young Ramu
Master Yerramilli Srinivas as Young Madhu

Soundtrack
Music composed by T. Chalapathi Rao.

References

External links 

1970s Telugu-language films
1972 drama films
1972 films
Films directed by T. Rama Rao
Films scored by T. Chalapathi Rao
Indian drama films